Scanian Guerilla is a 1941 Swedish historical drama film directed by Åke Ohberg.

Cast
 Edvard Persson as Grimme Jens
 Tekla Sjöblom as Cilla
 George Fant as Ored Jensen
 Oscar Ljung as Per Jensen
 Åke Ohberg as Nils Jensen
 Carl Ström as Helsing
 Eva Henning as Kerstin
 Sven Bergvall as Swedish colonel
 Bror Bügler as Lt. Cronhjort
 Gunnar Sjöberg as Långe-Tuve
 Yngve Nordwall as Sören

References

External links
 

1941 films
1941 drama films
Swedish drama films
Swedish black-and-white films
1940s Swedish-language films
Films directed by Åke Ohberg
1940s Swedish films